Cobb Memorial Library is a historic library building in Truro, Massachusetts.  The library was established through a donation by Elisha Wiley Cobb made in memory of his parents, and was built in 1912.  It is a rare example of Craftsman style architecture in the town.  The building served as the town's main library until 1999, when a new building was constructed in North Truro.  The building has since been converted for use by the Truro Historical Society.

The library was listed on the National Register of Historic Places in 2013.

See also
National Register of Historic Places listings in Barnstable County, Massachusetts

References

External links
 MACRIS Listing - Cobb Memorial Library

Libraries in Massachusetts
Truro, Massachusetts
National Register of Historic Places in Barnstable County, Massachusetts